The 1959–60 Greek Football Cup was the 18th edition of the Greek Football Cup. The competition culminated with the Greek Cup Final, replayed at Karaiskakis Stadium, on 11 September 1960, because of the previous match (7 August) draw. The match was contested by Olympiacos and Panathinaikos, with Olympiacos by winning 3–0.

Calendar
From Round of 32 onwards:

Knockout phase
In the knockout phase, teams play against each other over a single match. If the match ends up as a draw, extra time will be played and if the match remains a draw a replay match is set at the home of the guest team which the extra time rule stands as well. If a winner doesn't occur after the replay match the winner emerges by a flip of a coin.

Bracket

Round of 16

|}

Quarter-finals

||colspan="2" rowspan="3" 

|}

Semi-finals

||colspan="2" 

|}

* Panathinaikos won by the flip of a coin.

Final

The 18th Greek Cup Final was played at the Leoforos Alexandras Stadium and replayed at the Karaiskakis Stadium.

Replay match

References

External links
Greek Cup 1959-60 at RSSSF

Greek Football Cup seasons
Greek Cup
Cup